Han Dong may refer to:

 Han Dong (writer) (born 1961), Chinese writer
 Han Dong (politician) (born c. 1977), politician in Ontario, Canada
 Han Dong (actor) (born 1980), Chinese actor
 Han Dong (singer) (born 1996), Chinese-born Korean pop singer
 Han Dong (footballer) (born 2001), Chinese footballer